The William G. Carleton Auditorium, built in 1954, is a historic building on the campus of the University of Florida in Gainesville, Florida, in the United States. Like several other buildings on campus, it was designed by architect Guy Fulton in an early campus Brutalist style, and it is joined to Walker Hall by a breezeway. It seats 680 and was used as a lecture hall for the University College (predecessor to the College of Liberal Arts and Sciences). In 1970, it was renamed for William G. Carleton, longtime professor of history and social sciences known for the colorful presentation of his freshman "American Institutions" lectures.

In 2008 Carleton Auditorium became a contributing property in the University of Florida Campus Historic District which was added to the National Register of Historic Places on April 20, 1989.

See also
University of Florida
Buildings at the University of Florida
Campus Historic District

References

Buildings at the University of Florida
National Register of Historic Places in Gainesville, Florida
Guy Fulton buildings
Historic district contributing properties in Florida
University and college buildings on the National Register of Historic Places in Florida
University and college buildings completed in 1954
1954 establishments in Florida